East Kent Railway and similar terms may refer to three railways in Kent, England:

 East Kent Railway (1858–1859, in the Strood area), the predecessor of the London, Chatham and Dover Railway
 East Kent Light Railway (1909–1948, in the Shepherdswell area), one of the Colonel Stephens railways
 East Kent Railway (heritage) (from late 20th century, in the Shepherdswell area), a present-day heritage railway